Kalman Jacob Mann (5 July 1912 – 14 March 1997) was an Israeli physician specializing in pulmonology, and the eighth and longest-serving director general of the Hadassah Medical Organization. During his three decades at the helm of the Hadassah HMO, he was credited with the renovation of the hospital campus on Mount Scopus after the Six-Day War, and the construction of a new Hadassah medical center at Ein Kerem. He also sat on 14 different government committees, influencing Israeli health-care legislation. Following his retirement from Hadassah in 1981, Mann shepherded the development of the Yad Sarah medical equipment lending organization, serving as its chairman until his death in 1997.

Early life and education

Kalman Jacob Mann was born in Jerusalem to Yitzhak David Mann and his wife, Chaya, both Orthodox Jews. He was the eldest of five children. On his father's side, he was a seventh-generation Jerusalemite. He received both a secular and a Talmudic education during his youth, studying in the Tachkemoni School and earning a teacher's diploma at the Mizrahi Teachers Seminary. His father then sent him abroad to study economics at the London School of Economics in 1931. Although Mann wanted to study medicine, he acceded to his father's wishes. Though he could barely speak English, he passed the entrance exam, but three months into the term he realized that economics was not for him and asked his father if he could switch to medicine. His father agreed, whereupon he completed his preliminary studies at Chelsea Polytechnic and, that same year, entered University College Hospital Medical School. In 1937 he received a double degree in Bachelor of Medicine and Bachelor of Surgery, and was accepted as a member of the Royal College of Surgeons.

House physician
After graduation, Mann was named a house physician at the University College Hospital and spent two years attending to patients in the pulmonology department of various London hospitals. In 1939 he received his Doctor of Medicine degree as well as a diploma in tropical medicine and hygiene from the University of London. He also qualified as a member of the Royal College of Physicians. He married his first wife, Sylvia Gamse, in 1940. He was drafted into the emergency medical corps in World War II and served as a resuscitation officer at RAF Hendon, where he tended to pulmonary cases. Post-war, he worked for two years as a research physician at the Pneumoconiosis Research Unit in Penarth, Wales.

He became involved in Zionist activities as chairman of the Friends of the Jerusalem University in Cardiff and chairman of the Zionist organization in Queensbury, London.

Hadassah Director General

Mann returned to Jerusalem with his wife and two children in 1949 to accept a medical post at Hadassah Hospital. That year, however, the campus on Mount Scopus was cut off from the rest of Jerusalem by the 1949 Armistice Agreements, and hospital departments and clinics had taken up residence in a series of derelict buildings in western Jerusalem. Mann was instead offered an administrative position as deputy to the director general of Hadassah, Eli Davis, which he accepted. The hospital sent him to Rochester, New York to receive training in hospital administration from Dr. E. M. Bluestone, former medical director of Hadassah. In early 1951, when Davis announced his resignation to return to general practice, Mann was named his successor.

Mann proved to be a visionary director and successful fund-raiser, turning Hadassah from an institution crippled by war to one of the world's leading centers of medicine, teaching, and research. One of his first efforts was to locate a new campus for the hospital and raise the millions of dollars necessary to build it. The 600-bed hospital at Ein Kerem opened in May 1961. Mann also opened four out of the eventual five professional schools on that campus: pharmacology, dentistry, occupational therapy, and public health.

On June 6, 1967, a day after Israel gained Mount Scopus in the Six-Day War, Jerusalem Mayor Teddy Kollek called Mann and told him, "If you want your hospital, come and get it". Over the next eight years, Mann supervised the renovation of the Mount Scopus campus into a 300-bed medical center. He also developed a "community based outreach health centre" at Kiryat Yovel.

Over his three decades of leadership, Mann managed a budget that increased from $2.3 million to $93 million. He collected most of the funds for his projects from Hadassah, the Women’s Zionist Organization of America.

Yad Sarah
Mann retired from Hadassah on September 1, 1981, making him the longest-serving director general of the HMO; he served under ten presidents. He immediately undertook a full-time position as chairman of the Yad Sarah medical equipment lending organization, with which he had been involved on a volunteer basis since 1977. Mann's advice and expertise helped grow Yad Sarah from a neighborhood gemach into a nationwide home care equipment-lending organization with 72 branches and 4,200 volunteers by 1995. (As of 2013, the organization has over 100 branches and 6,000 volunteers, and saves the government an estimated $400 million annually in hospitalization expenses.) After his death, Mann's son, Professor Jonathan Mann, became a member of the Yad Sarah presidium.

Other activities and affiliations
Mann was a member of 14 government committees convened on various aspects of health care, serving as chairman of five of them – thus wielding significant influence on health care legislation. Among those committees were the Supreme Medical Council and the Advisory Council for Matters of Preventative Medicine.

In 1970 Mann was accepted as a Fellow of the Royal College of Physicians.

In 1994 Manfred Wasserman conducted an oral history project with Mann, taping the former director general for more than 17 hours and compiling his memories in the book Kalman Jacob Mann: Reflections on a life in health care (Rubin Mass).

Personal
Mann married his first wife, Sylvia, in London in 1940. They had four children. He married his second wife, Bluma, on January 16, 1995.

Kalman and Bluma Mann were seriously injured in two automobile accidents, one on April 24, 1996, and a second on February 28, 1997. Mann died of his injuries from the second accident on March 14, 1997, at the Hadassah Medical Center at Ein Kerem.

Bibliography

References

Sources

External links
"Dr. Kalman Mann, Director of Hadassah Medical Organization, speaking at the rededication of Hadassah Hospital on Mount Scopus, Jerusalem" (1975 audio recording)
"Dr. Mann Describes Hadassah Medical Aid to Young Terrorist, Other Arabs" Jewish Telegraphic Agency, October 15, 1969

Jewish physicians
Israeli pulmonologists
Alumni of the UCL Medical School
Fellows of the Royal College of Physicians
Physicians from Jerusalem
Road incident deaths in Israel
1912 births
1997 deaths
British Army personnel of World War II
Israeli healthcare managers
20th-century Israeli physicians